Mishkenot Sha'ananim (lit. Peaceful Dwellings) was the first Jewish settlement built outside the walls of the Old City of Jerusalem, on a hill directly across from Mount Zion. It was built in 1859–1860. This guesthouse was one of the first structures to be built outside the Old City, the others being Kerem Avraham, the Schneller Orphanage, Bishop Gobat school, and the Russian Compound.

History

Ottoman period
Mishkenot Sha'anim was built by British Jewish banker and philanthropist Sir Moses Montefiore in 1860, after he acquired the land from the Governor of Jerusalem, Ahmad Agha Duzdar.

It was built as an almshouse, paid for by the estate of an American Jewish businessman from New Orleans, Judah Touro. Since it was outside the walls and open to Bedouin raids, pillage and general banditry rampant in the region at the time, the Jews were reluctant to move in, even though the housing was luxurious compared to the derelict and overcrowded houses in the Old City. As an incentive, people were paid to live there, and a stone wall was built around the compound with a heavy door that was locked at night for defense. The name of the neighborhood was taken from the Book of Isaiah: "My people will abide in peaceful habitation, in secure dwellings and in peaceful resting places". It later became part of Yemin Moshe which was established in 1892–1894.

Jordanian period

After the 1948 Arab–Israeli War, when the Old City was captured by the Arab Legion, Mishkenot Sha'ananim bordered on no man's land in proximity to the armistice line with the Kingdom of Jordan, and many residents of the Yemin Moshe quarter left in the wake of sniper attacks by Jordanian Arab Legionnaires. Only the poorest inhabitants remained, turning the complex into a slum.

Restoration after 1967
The no-man's-land bordering Mishkenot Sha'ananim was captured by Israel during the 1967 War, together with the rest of Eastern and Old Jerusalem.

In 1973, Mishkenot Sha'ananim was turned into an upscale guesthouse for internationally acclaimed authors, artists and musicians visiting Israel. Apart from guesthouse facilities, it is now a convention center and home of the Jerusalem Music Center. The music center was inaugurated by Pablo Casals shortly before his death.

The Jerusalem Center for Ethics was established in Mishkenot Sha'ananim in 1997. Yitzhak Zamir has been heading the board of directors since his retirement as justice of the Israeli Supreme Court in 2001.

See also
Yemin Moshe
Mea Shearim
Montefiore Windmill
Statue of Winston Churchill, Mishkenot Sha’ananim
Mishkenot Shaananim International Writers Festival
Expansion of Jerusalem in the 19th century

References

Populated places established in 1861
Neighbourhoods of Jerusalem
Buildings and structures in Jerusalem
Jews and Judaism in Ottoman Palestine
1861 establishments in Ottoman Syria